Nikolai Ottovich von Essen (tr. ;  – ) was a Russian naval commander and admiral descended from the Baltic German noble Essen family. For more than two centuries, his ancestors had served in the Imperial Russian Navy, and seven had been awarded the Order of St. George, the highest military award of the Russian Empire. Essen was regarded  as one of the most prominent admirals of the Russian naval force during World War I (1914–1918).

Biography

Early on in his life, Essen received home education; he was well-educated and fluent in English, French, Russian, and his native German. He graduated from the Naval Cadet Corps in 1880, after a two-year foreign cruise, attended the engineering department of the Nikolayev Naval Academy from 1883 to 1886. He was commissioned as a lieutenant in 1891 and served with the Russian Pacific Fleet from 1892 to 1896, and with the Russian Mediterranean Squadron from 1897.

In the early part of his career, he commanded Minesweeper No. 120 (1897–98), the gunboat Grozyachiy (1898–1900), and the steamship Slavianka (1901–1902) in the Black Sea. After a brief assignment as an instructor at the Naval Cadet Corps, he was appointed captain of the cruiser  (1902–1904), which was stationed at Vladivostok.

At the start of the Russo-Japanese War, Admiral Stepan Makarov reassigned Essen to command the battleship  at Port Arthur. After the Battle of the Yellow Sea, Essen also commanded the land-based defences at the entrance to Port Arthur. During the last weeks of the Japanese siege, he moved Sevastopol out of the relative safety of the inner harbour to use her firepower to help repulse repeated Japanese attacks. However, on hearing of the surrender of Port Arthur, he moved Sevastopol into deeper water and then scuttled her, making her the only battleship that the Imperial Japanese Navy could not raise after the war. He was sent as a prisoner of war to Japan, but was paroled after less than two months, and returned to St Petersburg to a hero's welcome. For his actions, Essen was awarded the Order of St. George (3rd degree) and promoted to captain.

After the end of the war, Essen became the first captain of the British-built armoured cruiser . He was promoted to rear admiral in 1908 and appointed commander-in-chief of the Russian Baltic Fleet in 1909 when this position was created. He was promoted to admiral in 1913. Essen, from lessons learned in the war against Japan and the mutiny of the Black Sea Fleet, urged far-reaching reforms and modernisation of the Imperial Russian Navy. He recognised early the importance of submarines and aircraft, and sought to promote younger officers based on their knowledge of modern strategy and tactics, also establishing a naval training academy at Kronstadt. Above all, he pushed for the operational autonomy of the Baltic Fleet.

Widely regarded as the most able of Russian admirals in World War I, Essen led the Baltic Fleet energetically during the first year of the war. His forces at the time consisted of four battleships, five cruisers, four light cruisers, 62 torpedo boats, 12 submarines and numerous smaller and specialised units. His superiors preferred a cautious defensive position in the Baltic Sea, forcing Essen to concentrate his forces in the Gulf of Finland to protect Petrograd, with older units in the Gulf of Riga, and effectively abandoning Liepāja to the Germans.
Nevertheless, on 9 August 1914, Essen led part of his fleet towards Gotland with the intent to contain the Swedish navy and deliver a note of his own making which would have violated Swedish neutrality and may have brought Sweden into the war. He was ordered back before his plan could be executed. Although of little success, the mission went a long way towards maintaining morale within the Baltic Fleet.

Essen died unexpectedly after a short bout of pneumonia in May 1915. He is buried in the Novodevichy Cemetery (Saint Petersburg). He was survived by his wife, Mary, and son Anthony (who was later killed in action as commander of the submarine AG-14 on 24 October 1917), and two daughters who married naval officers.

Awards and commemoration
 Golden Sword for Bravery (14 March 1904)
 Order of St. George (4th class), (17 April 1905)
 Order of the White Eagle with Swords (12 December 1914)

Notes

References

 
 
 Spencer C. Tucker, Who's Who in Twentieth Century Warfare, Routledge, London & New York 2001 (pg. 92) 
  ISSN 1404-0581 http://libris.kb.se/bib/10297983
 

1860 births
1915 deaths
Military personnel from Saint Petersburg
Baltic-German people
Russian people of German descent
Imperial Russian Navy admirals
Recipients of the Gold Sword for Bravery
Russian military personnel of the Russo-Japanese War
Russian military personnel of World War I
Recipients of the Order of the White Eagle (Russia)
Honorary Knights Commander of the Royal Victorian Order
Deaths from pneumonia in Estonia
Burials at Novodevichy Cemetery (Saint Petersburg)
Admirals of World War I
Essen family
Naval Cadet Corps alumni